These are the official results of the Men's Discus Throw event at the 1993 World Championships in Stuttgart, Germany. There were a total of 31 participating athletes, with the final held on Tuesday August 17, 1993. The qualification mark was set at 63.00 metres.

Medalists

Schedule
All times are Central European Time (UTC+1)

Abbreviations
All results shown are in metres

Qualification
 Held on Monday 1993-08-16

Final

See also
 1992 Men's Olympic Discus Throw
 1994 Men's European Championships Discus Throw

References
 Results
 IAAF

D
Discus throw at the World Athletics Championships